Don't Disturb Mi is the 67th  studio album releases by a Jamaican Rapper and DJ, Macka Diamond, released on February 7, 2012, under Money Ooh Productions/VPAL.

This album replicates today's Reggae/Dancehall culture. Macka Diamond says "so basically there is a little of everything for everyone,all the fans" in response to what can fans expect from her on this album. Fans should enjoy listening while driving, going about their daily activities, hanging out with friends or on the dance floor of any party.

This was her first full-album release after she won the International Reggae and World Music Awards (IRAWMA) Best Female International Rapper/DJ for 2011.

Track listing

References

External links
 vpreggae.com

2012 albums
Macka Diamond albums